The history of immigration to the United States details the movement of people to the United States, from the colonial era to the present. The United States experienced successive waves of immigration, particularly from Europe, and later from Asia and Latin America. Colonial era immigrants often repaid the cost of transoceanic transportation by becoming indentured servants where the new employer paid the ship's captain. Starting in the late 19th century, immigration was restricted from China and Japan. In the 1920s, restrictive immigration quotas were imposed, although political refugees had special status. Numerical restrictions ended in 1965. In recent years, the largest numbers have come from Asia and Central America.

Attitudes towards new immigrants have cycled between favorable and hostile since the 1790s. Recent debates focus on the Southern border, and on the status of "dreamers" who have lived almost their entire life in the U.S. after illegally migrating with their families as children.

Colonial era 

In 1607, the first successful English colony settled in Jamestown, Virginia. Once tobacco was found to be a profitable cash crop, many plantations were established along the Chesapeake Bay in Virginia and Maryland.

Thus began the first and longest era of immigration, lasting until the American Revolution in 1775; during this time settlements grew from initial English toe-holds from the New World to British America. It brought Northern European immigrants, primarily of British, German, and Dutch extraction.  The British ruled from the mid-17th century and they were by far the largest group of arrivals, remaining within the British Empire. Over 90% of these early immigrants became farmers.

Large numbers of young men and women came alone as indentured servants. Their passage was paid by employers in the colonies who needed help on the farms or in shops. Indentured servants were provided food, housing, clothing and training but they did not receive wages. At the end of the indenture (usually around age 21, or after a service of seven years) they were free to marry and start their own farms.

New England 
Seeking religious freedom in the New World, one hundred English Pilgrims established a small settlement near Plymouth, Massachusetts in 1620. Tens of thousands of English Puritans arrived, mostly from the East Anglian parts of England (Norfolk, Suffolk, East Sussex., and settled in Boston, Massachusetts and adjacent areas from around 1629 to 1640 to create a land dedicated to their religion. The earliest New English colonies, Massachusetts, Connecticut, Rhode Island, and New Hampshire, were established along the northeast coast. Large scale immigration to this region ended before 1700, though a small but steady trickle of later arrivals continued.

The New English colonists were the most urban and educated of all their contemporaries, and they  had many skilled farmers, tradesmen and craftsmen among them. They started the first university, Harvard, in 1635 in order to train their ministers. They mostly settled in small villages for mutual support (nearly all of them had their own militias) and common religious activities. Shipbuilding, commerce, agriculture, and fishing were their main sources of income. New England's healthy climate (the cold winters killed the mosquitoes and other disease-bearing insects), small widespread villages (minimizing the spread of disease), and an abundant food supply resulted in the lowest death rate and the highest birth rate of any of the colonies. The Eastern and Northern frontier around the initial New England settlements was mainly settled by the descendants of the original New Englanders. Immigration to the New England colonies after 1640 and the start of the English Civil War decreased to less than 1% (about equal to the death rate) in nearly all of the years prior to 1845. The rapid growth of the New England colonies (approximately 900,000 by 1790) was almost entirely due to the high birth rate (>3%) and the low death rate (<1%) per year.

Dutch
The Dutch colonies, organized by the United East Indian Company, were first established along the Hudson River in present-day New York state starting about 1626. Wealthy Dutch patroons set up large landed estates along the Hudson River and brought in farmers who became renters. Others established rich trading posts to trade with Native Americans and started cities such as New Amsterdam (now New York City) and Albany, New York. After the British seized the colony and renamed it New York, Germans (from the Palatinate) and Yankees (from New England) began arriving.

Middle colonies
Maryland, New York, New Jersey, Pennsylvania, and Delaware formed the middle colonies.  Pennsylvania was settled by Quakers from Britain, followed by Ulster Scots (Northern Ireland) on the frontier and numerous German Protestant sects, including the German Palatines. The earlier colony of New Sweden had small settlements on the lower Delaware River, with immigrants of Swedes and Finns. These colonies were absorbed by 1676.

The middle colonies were scattered west of New York City (established 1626; taken over by the English in 1664) and Philadelphia, Pennsylvania (established 1682). New Amsterdam/New York had the most diverse residents from different nations and prospered as a major trading and commercial center after about 1700. From around 1680 to 1725, Pennsylvania was controlled by the Quakers.  The commercial center of Philadelphia was run mostly by prosperous Quakers, supplemented by many small farming and trading communities, with a strong German contingent located in villages in the Delaware River valley.

Starting around 1680, when Pennsylvania was founded, many more settlers arrived to the middle colonies. Many Protestant sects were attracted by freedom of religion and good, cheap land. They were about 60% British and 33% German.  By 1780, New York's population were around 27% descendants of Dutch settlers, about 6% were African, and the remainder were mostly English with a wide mixture of other Europeans. New Jersey, and Delaware had a British majority, with 7–11% German-descendants, about 6% African population, and a small contingent of the Swedish descendants of New Sweden.

Frontier
The fourth major center of settlement was the western frontier, located in the inland parts of Pennsylvania and south colonies. It was mainly settled from about 1717 to 1775 by Presbyterian farmers from North England border lands, Scotland, and Ulster, fleeing hard times and religious persecution.  Between 250,000 and 400,000 Scots-Irish migrated to America in the 18th century. The Scots-Irish soon became the dominant culture of the Appalachians from Pennsylvania to Georgia. Areas where 20th-century censuses reported mostly 'American' ancestry were the places where, historically, northern English, Scottish and Scots-Irish Protestants settled: in the interior of the South, and the Appalachian region. Scots-Irish American immigrants, were made up of people from the southernmost counties of Scotland who had initially settled in Ireland. They were heavily Presbyterian, and largely self-sufficient. The Scots-Irish arrived in large numbers during the early 18th century and they often preferred to settle in the back country and the frontier from Pennsylvania to Georgia, where they mingled with second generation and later English settlers. They enjoyed the very cheap land and independence from established governments common to frontier settlements.

Southern colonies
The mostly agricultural Southern English colonies initially had very high death rates for new settlers due to malaria, yellow fever, and other diseases as well as skirmishes with Native Americans. Despite this, a steady flow of new immigrants, mostly from Central England and the London area, kept up population growth. As early as 1630, initial areas of settlement had been largely cleared of Native Americans by major outbreaks of measles, smallpox, and bubonic plague beginning already decades before European settlers began arriving in large numbers. The leading killer was smallpox, which arrived in the New World around 1510–1530.

Initially, the plantations established in these colonies were mostly owned by friends (mostly minor aristocrats and gentry) of the British-appointed governors. A group of Gaelic-speaking Scottish Highlanders created a settlement at Cape Fear in North Carolina, which remained culturally distinct until the mid-18th century, at which point it was swallowed up by the dominant English-origin culture. Many settlers from Europe arrived as indentured servants, having had their passage paid for, in return for five to seven years of work, including free room and board, clothing, and training, but without cash wages. After their periods of indenture expired, many of these former servants founded small farms on the frontier.

By the early 18th century, the involuntary migration of African slaves was a significant component of the immigrant population in the Southern colonies. Between 1700 and 1740, a large majority of the net overseas migration to these colonies were Africans. In the third quarter of the 18th century, the population of that region amounted to roughly 55% British, 38% black, and 7% German. In 1790, 42% of the population in South Carolina and Georgia was of African origin. Before 1800, the growing of tobacco, rice and indigo in plantations in the Southern colonies relied heavily on the labor of slaves from Africa. The Atlantic slave trade to mainland North America stopped during the Revolution and was outlawed in most states by 1800 and the entire nation in 1808 Act Prohibiting Importation of Slaves, although some slaves continued to be smuggled in illegally.

Characteristics
While the thirteen colonies differed in how they were settled and by whom, they had many similarities. Nearly all were settled and financed by privately organized British settlers or families using free enterprise without any significant Royal or Parliamentary government support. Nearly all commercial activity comprised small, privately owned businesses with good credit both in America and in England, which was essential since they were often cash poor. Most settlements were largely independent of British trade, since they grew or manufactured nearly everything they needed; the average cost of imports per household was 5–15 pounds sterling per year. Most settlements consisted of complete family groups with several generations present. The population was rural, with close to 80% owning the land on which they lived and farmed. After 1700, as the Industrial Revolution progressed, more of the population started to move to cities, as had happened in Britain. Initially, the Dutch and German settlers spoke languages brought over from Europe, but English was the main language of commerce. Governments and laws mainly copied English models. The only major British institution to be abandoned was the aristocracy, which was almost totally absent. The settlers generally established their own law-courts and popularly elected governments. This self-ruling pattern became so ingrained that for the next 200 years almost all new settlements had their own government up and running shortly after arrival.

After the colonies were established, their population growth comprised almost entirely organic growth, with foreign-born immigrant populations rarely exceeding 10%. The last significant colonies to be settled primarily by immigrants were Pennsylvania (post-1680s), the Carolinas (post-1663), and Georgia (post-1732). Even here, the immigrants came mostly from England and Scotland, with the exception of Pennsylvania's large Germanic contingent. Elsewhere, internal American migration from other colonies provided nearly all of the settlers for each new colony or state. Populations grew by about 80% over a 20-year period, at a "natural" annual growth rate of 3%.

Over half of all new British immigrants in the South initially arrived as indentured servants, mostly poor young people who could not find work in England nor afford passage to America. In addition, about 60,000 British convicts guilty of minor offences were transported to the British colonies in the 18th century, with the "serious" criminals generally having been executed. Ironically, these convicts are often the only immigrants with nearly complete immigration records, as other immigrants typically arrived with few or no records.

Other colonies

Spanish
Although Spain set up a few forts in Florida, notably San Agustín (present-day Saint Augustine) in 1565, they sent few settlers to Florida. Spaniards moving north from Mexico founded the San Juan on the Rio Grande in 1598 and Santa Fe, New Mexico in 1607–1608. The settlers were forced to leave temporarily for 12 years (1680–1692) by the Pueblo Revolt before returning.

Spanish Texas lasted from 1690 to 1821, when Texas was governed as a colony that was separate from New Spain. In 1731, Canary Islanders (or "Isleños") arrived to establish San Antonio. The majority of the few hundred Texan and New Mexican colonizers in the Spanish colonial period were Spaniards and criollos. California, New Mexico and Arizona all had Spanish settlements. In 1781, Spanish settlers founded Los Angeles.

At the time the former Spanish colonies joined the United States, Californios in California numbered about 10,000 and Tejanos in Texas about 4,000. New Mexico had 47,000 Spanish settlers in 1842; Arizona was only thinly settled.

However, not all these settlers were of European descent. As in the rest of the American colonies, new settlements were based on the casta system, and although all could speak Spanish, it was a melting pot of whites, natives, and mestizos.

French
In the late 17th century, French expeditions established a foothold on the Saint Lawrence River, Mississippi River and Gulf Coast. Interior trading posts, forts and cities were thinly spread. The city of Detroit was the third-largest settlement in New France. New Orleans expanded when several thousand French-speaking refugees from the region of Acadia made their way to Louisiana following British expulsion, settling largely in the Southwest Louisiana region now called Acadiana. Their descendants are now called Cajun and still dominate the coastal areas.  About 7,000 French-speaking immigrants settled in Louisiana during the 18th century.

Population in 1790
The following were the countries of origin for new arrivals to the United States before 1790. The regions marked with an asterisk were part of Great Britain. The ancestry of the 3.9 million population in 1790 has been estimated by various sources by sampling last names from the 1790 census and assigning them a country of origin. The Irish in the 1790 census were mostly Scots-Irish. The French were primarily Huguenots. The total U.S. Catholic population in 1790 was probably less than 5%. The Native American population inside territorial U.S. boundaries was less than 100,000.

The 1790 population reflected the loss of approximately 46,000 Loyalists, or "Tories", who immigrated to Canada at the end of the American Revolution, 10,000 who went to England and 6,000 to the Caribbean.

The 1790 census recorded 3.9 million inhabitants (not counting American Indians). Of the total white population of just under 3.2 million in 1790, approximately 86% was of British ancestry (60%, or 1.9 million, English, 4.3% Welsh, 5.4% Scots, 5.8% Irish (South), and 10.5% Scots-Irish. Among those whose ancestry was from outside of British Isles, Germans were 9%, Dutch 3.4%, French 2.1%, and Swedish 0.25%; blacks made up 19.3% (or 762,000) of the U.S. population. The number of Scots was 200,000; Irish and Scot-Irish 625,000. The overwhelming majority of Southern Irish were Protestant, as there were only 60,000 Catholics in the United States in 1790, 1.6% of the population. Many U.S. Catholics were descendants of English Catholic settlers in the 17th century; the rest were Irish, German and some Acadians who remained. In this era, the population roughly doubled every 23 years, mostly due to natural increase. Relentless population expansion pushed the U.S. frontier to the Pacific by 1848. Most immigrants came long distances to settle in the United States. However, many Irish left Canada for the United States in the 1840s. French Canadians who moved south from Quebec after 1860, and the Mexicans who came north after 1911, found it easier to move back and forth.

1790 to 1850s 
If one excludes enslaved Africans, there was relatively little immigration from 1770 to 1830; while there was significant emigration from the U.S. to Canada, including about 75,000 Loyalists as well as Germans and others looking for better farmland in what is now Ontario. Large-scale immigration in the 1830s to 1850s came from Britain, Ireland, Germany. Most were attracted by the cheap farmland. Some were artisans and skilled factory workers attracted by the first stage of industrialization.  The Irish Catholics were primarily unskilled workers who built a majority of the canals and railroads, settling in urban areas. Many Irish went to the emerging textile mill towns of the Northeast, while others became longshoremen in the growing Atlantic and Gulf port cities. Half the Germans headed to farms, especially in the Midwest (with some to Texas), while the other half became craftsmen in urban areas.

Nativism took the form of political anti-Catholicism directed mostly at the Irish (as well as Germans). It became important briefly in the mid-1850s in the guise of the Know Nothing party. Most of the Catholics and German Lutherans became Democrats, and most of the other Protestants joined the new Republican Party.  During the Civil War, ethnic communities supported the war and produced large numbers of soldiers on both sides. Riots broke out in New York City and other Irish and German strongholds in 1863 when a draft was instituted, particularly in light of the provision exempting those who could afford payment.

Immigration totaled 8,385 in 1820, with immigration totals gradually increasing to 23,322 by the year 1830; for the 1820s decade immigration more than doubled to 143,000.  Between 1831 and 1840, immigration more than quadrupled to a total of 599,000. These included about 207,000 Irish, starting to emigrate in large numbers following Britain's easing of travel restrictions, and about 152,000 Germans, 76,000 British, and 46,000 French, constituting the next largest immigrant groups of the decade.

Between 1841 and 1850, immigration nearly tripled again, totaling 1,713,000 immigrants, including at least 781,000 Irish, 435,000 Germans, 267,000 British, and 77,000 French. The Irish, driven by the Great Famine (1845–1849), emigrated directly from their homeland to escape poverty and death. The  failed revolutions of 1848 brought many intellectuals and activists to exile in the U.S. Bad times and poor conditions in Europe drove people out, while land, relatives, freedom, opportunity, and jobs in the US lured them in.

Starting in 1820, some federal records, including ship passenger lists, were kept for immigration purposes, and a gradual increase in immigration was recorded; more complete immigration records provide data on immigration after 1830. Though conducted since 1790, the census of 1850 was the first in which place of birth was asked specifically. The foreign-born population in the U.S. likely reached its minimum around 1815, at approximately 100,000 or 1% of the population. By 1815, most of the immigrants who arrived before the American Revolution had died, and there had been almost no new immigration thereafter.

Nearly all population growth up to 1830 was by internal increase; around 98% of the population was native-born. By 1850, this shifted to about 90% native-born. The first significant Catholic immigration started in the mid-1840s, shifting the population from about 95% Protestant down to about 90% by 1850.

In 1848, the Treaty of Guadalupe Hidalgo, concluding the Mexican War, extended U.S. citizenship to approximately 60,000 Mexican residents of the New Mexico Territory and 10,000 living in Mexican California. An additional approximate 2,500 foreign-born California residents also became U.S. citizens.

In 1849, the California Gold Rush attracted 100,000 would-be miners from the Eastern U.S., Latin America, China, Australia, and Europe.  California became a state in 1850 with a population of about 90,000.

1850 to 1930

Demography
Between 1850 and 1930, about 5 million Germans migrated to the United States, peaking between 1881 and 1885 when a million Germans settled primarily in the Midwest. Between 1820 and 1930, 3.5 million  British and 4.5 million Irish entered America. Before 1845, most Irish immigrants were Protestants. After 1845, Irish Catholics began arriving in large numbers, largely driven by the Great Famine.

After 1880, larger steam-powered oceangoing ships replaced sailing ships, which resulted in lower fares and greater immigrant mobility.  In addition, the expansion of a railroad system in Europe made it easier for people to reach oceanic ports to board ships.  Meanwhile, farming improvements in Southern Europe and the Russian Empire created surplus labor. Young people between the ages of 15 to 30 were predominant among newcomers. This wave of migration, constituting the third episode in the history of U.S. immigration, may be better referred to as a flood of immigrants, as nearly 25 million Europeans made the long trip. Italians, Greeks, Hungarians, Poles, and others speaking Slavic languages made up the bulk of this migration. 2.5 to 4 million Jews were among them.

Destinations

Each group evinced a distinctive migration pattern in terms of the gender balance within the migratory pool, the permanence of their migration, their literacy rates, the balance between adults and children, and the like. But they shared one overarching characteristic: they flocked to urban destinations and made up the bulk of the U.S. industrial labor pool, making possible the emergence of such industries as steel, coal, automotive, textile, and garment production, enabling the United States to leap into the front ranks of the world's economic giants.

More than 23 million people immigrated to the United States from 1880-1930 alone. Although many of these immigrants settled in urban centers, not all of them stayed in the U.S. permanently. In some groups, like the Southern Italian contadini, it was common to return to their place of origin and about half of them did. Others, like 90% of  eastern European Jews who immigrated to the United States, stayed permanently. Within the first decade of the 20th century 14.7 percent of Americans were born in a different country, 22 percent of this population settled in Urban areas.

Their urban destinations, numbers, and perhaps an antipathy towards foreigners, led to the emergence of the second wave of organized xenophobia. By the 1890s, many Americans, particularly from the ranks of the well-off, white, and native-born, considered immigration to pose a serious danger to the nation's health and security. In 1893 a group formed the Immigration Restriction League, and it, along with other similarly inclined organizations, began to press Congress for severe curtailment of foreign immigration.

Irish and German Catholic immigration was opposed in the 1850s by the nativist movement, originating in New York in 1843 as the American Republican Party (not to be confused with the modern Republican Party). It was empowered by popular fears that the country was being overwhelmed by Catholic immigrants, who were often regarded as hostile to American values and controlled by the Pope in Rome. Active mainly from 1854 to 1856, it strove to curb immigration and naturalization, though its efforts met with little success. There were few prominent leaders, and the largely middle-class and Protestant membership fragmented over the issue of slavery, most often joining the Republican Party by the time of the 1860 presidential election.

European immigrants joined the Union Army in large numbers, including 177,000 born in Germany and 144,000 born in Ireland, a full 16% of the Union Army. Many Germans could see the parallels between slavery and serfdom in the old fatherland.

Between 1840 and 1930, about 900,000 French Canadians left Quebec in order to immigrate to the United States and work mainly in New England. About half returned. Considering the fact that the population of Quebec was only 892,061 in 1851, this was a massive exodus. 13.6 million Americans claimed to have French ancestry in the 1980 census. A large portion of them have ancestors who emigrated from French Canada, since immigration from France was low throughout the history of the United States. The communities established by these immigrants became known as Little Canada.

Shortly after the American Civil War, some states started to pass their own immigration laws, which prompted the U.S. Supreme Court to rule in 1875 that immigration was a federal responsibility.
In 1875, the nation passed its first immigration law, the Page Act of 1875, also known as the Asian Exclusion Act, outlawing the importation of Asian contract laborers, any Asian woman who would engage in prostitution, and all people considered to be convicts in their own countries.

In 1882, Congress passed the Chinese Exclusion Act. By excluding all Chinese laborers from entering the country, the Chinese Exclusion Act severely curtailed the number of immigrants of Chinese descent allowed into the United States for 10 years. The law was renewed in 1892 and 1902. During this period, Chinese migrants illegally entered the United States through the loosely guarded U.S.–Canadian border. The Chinese Exclusion Act was repealed with the passage of the Magnuson Act in 1943.

Prior to 1890, the individual states, rather than the federal government, regulated immigration into the United States. The Immigration Act of 1891 established a Commissioner of Immigration in the Treasury Department.  The Canadian Agreement of 1894 extended U.S. immigration restrictions to Canadian ports.

The Dillingham Commission was set up by Congress in 1907 to investigate the effects of immigration on the country. The Commission's 40-volume analysis of immigration during the previous three decades led it to conclude that the major source of immigration had shifted from Central, Northern, and Western Europeans to Southern Europeans and Russians. It was, however, apt to make generalizations about regional groups that were subjective and failed to differentiate between distinct cultural attributes.

The 1910s marked the high point of Italian immigration to the United States. Over two million Italians immigrated in those years, with a total of 5.3 million between 1880 and 1920. About half returned to Italy, after working an average of five years in the U.S.

About 1.5 million Swedes and Norwegians immigrated to the United States within this period, due to opportunity in America and poverty and religious oppression in united Sweden–Norway. This accounted for around 20% of the total population of the kingdom at that time. They settled mainly in the Midwest, especially Minnesota and the Dakotas. Danes had comparably low immigration rates due to a better economy; after 1900 many Danish immigrants were Mormon converts who moved to Utah.

Over two million Central Europeans, mainly Catholics and Jews, immigrated between 1880 and 1924. People of Polish ancestry are the largest Central European ancestry group in the United States after Germans. Immigration of Eastern Orthodox ethnic groups was much lower.

Lebanese and Syrian immigrants started to settle in large numbers in the late 19th and early 20th centuries. The vast majority of the immigrants from Lebanon and Syria were Christians, but smaller numbers of Jews, Muslims, and Druze also settled. Many lived in New York City's Little Syria and in Boston. In the 1920s and 1930s, a large number of these immigrants set out West, with Detroit getting a large number of Middle Eastern immigrants, as well as many Midwestern areas where the Arabs worked as farmers.

Congress passed a literacy requirement in 1917 to curb the influx of low-skilled immigrants from entering the country.

Congress passed the Emergency Quota Act in 1921, followed by the Immigration Act of 1924, which supplanted earlier acts to effectively ban all immigration from Asia and set quotas for the Eastern Hemisphere so that no more than 2% of nationalities as represented in the 1890 census were allowed to immigrate to America.

New Immigration

"New immigration" was a term from the late 1880s that refers to the influx of Catholic and Jewish immigrants from southern and eastern Europe (areas that previously sent few immigrants). The great majority came through Ellis Island in New York, thus making the Northeast a major target of settlement. However there were a few efforts, such as the Galveston Movement, to redirect immigrants to other ports and disperse some of the settlement to other areas of the country.

Nativists feared the new arrivals lacked the political, social, and occupational skills needed to successfully assimilate into American culture. This raised the issue of whether the U.S. was still a "melting pot", or if it had just become a "dumping ground", and many old-stock Americans worried about negative effects on the economy, politics, and culture.  A major proposal was to impose a literacy test, whereby applicants had to be able to read and write in their own language before they were admitted. In Southern and Eastern Europe, literacy was low because the governments did not invest in schools.

1920 to 2000 

Restriction proceeded piecemeal over the course of the late 19th and early 20th centuries, but immediately after the end of World War I (1914–1918) and into the early 1920s, Congress changed the nation's basic policy about immigration. The National Origins Formula of 1921 (and its final form in 1924) not only restricted the number of immigrants who might enter the United States but also assigned slots according to quotas based on national origins. The bill was so limiting that the number of immigrants coming to the U.S. between 1921 and 1922 decreased by nearly 500,000. A complicated piece of legislation, it essentially gave preference to immigrants from Central, Northern, and Western Europe, limiting the numbers from Eastern Europe and Southern Europe, and gave zero quotas to Asia. However close family members could come.

The legislation excluded Latin America from the quota system. Immigrants could and did move quite freely from Mexico, the Caribbean (including Jamaica, Barbados, and Haiti), and other parts of Central and South America.

The era of the 1924 legislation lasted until 1965. During those 40 years, the United States began to admit, case by case, limited numbers of refugees. Jewish refugees from Nazi Germany before World War II, Jewish Holocaust survivors after the war, non-Jewish displaced persons fleeing communist rule in Central Europe and the Soviet Union, Hungarians seeking refuge after their failed uprising in 1956, and Cubans after the 1959 revolution managed to find haven in the United States when their plight moved the collective conscience of America, but the basic immigration law remained in place.

Equal Nationality Act of 1934
This law allowed foreign-born children of American mothers and alien fathers who had entered America before the age of 18 and had lived in America for five years to apply for American citizenship for the first time. It also made the naturalization process quicker for the alien husbands of American wives. This law equalized expatriation, immigration, naturalization, and repatriation between women and men. However, it was not applied retroactively, and was modified by later laws, such as the Nationality Act of 1940.

Filipino immigration
In 1934, the Tydings–McDuffie Act provided independence of the Philippines on July 4, 1946. Until 1965, national origin quotas strictly limited immigration from the Philippines. In 1965, after revision of the immigration law, significant Filipino immigration began, totaling 1,728,000 by 2004.

Postwar immigration
In 1945, the War Brides Act allowed foreign-born wives of U.S. citizens who had served in the U.S. Armed Forces to immigrate to the United States. In 1946, The War Brides Act was extended to include the fiancés of American soldiers. In 1946, the Luce–Celler Act extended the right to become naturalized citizens to those from the newly independent nation of the Philippines and to Asian Indians, the immigration quota being set at 100 people per year per country.

At the end of World War II, "regular" immigration almost immediately increased under the official national origins quota system as refugees from war-torn Europe began immigrating to the U.S. After the war, there were jobs for nearly everyone who wanted one, when most women employed during the war went back into the home. From 1941 to 1950, 1,035,000 people immigrated to the U.S., including 226,000 from Germany, 139,000 from the UK, 171,000 from Canada, 60,000 from Mexico, and 57,000 from Italy.

The Displaced Persons Act of 1948 finally allowed the displaced people of World War II to start immigrating.  Some 200,000 Europeans and 17,000 orphans displaced by World War II were initially allowed to immigrate to the United States outside of immigration quotas. President Harry S. Truman signed the first Displaced Persons (DP) act on June 25, 1948, allowing entry for 200,000 DPs, then followed with the more accommodating second DP act on June 16, 1950, allowing entry for another 200,000. This quota, including acceptance of 55,000 Volksdeutschen, required sponsorship for all immigrants. The American program was the most notoriously bureaucratic of all the DP programs and much of the humanitarian effort was undertaken by charitable organizations, such as the Lutheran World Federation as well as other ethnic groups. Along with an additional quota of 200,000 granted in 1953 and more in succeeding years, a total of nearly 600,000 refugees were allowed into the country outside the quota system, second only to Israel's 650,000.

1950s
In 1950, after the start of the Korean War, the Internal Security Act barred admission of communists, who might engage in activities "which would be prejudicial to the public interest, or would endanger the welfare or safety of the United States." Significant Korean immigration began in 1965, totaling 848,000 by 2004.

The Immigration and Nationality Act of 1952 affirmed the national-origins quota system of 1924 and limited total annual immigration to one-sixth of one percent of the population of the continental United States in 1920, or 175,455. This exempted the spouses and children of U.S. citizens and people born in the Western Hemisphere from the quota. In 1953, the Refugee Relief Act extended refugee status to non-Europeans.

In 1954, Operation Wetback forced the return of thousands of illegal immigrants to Mexico. Between 1944 and 1954, "the decade of the wetback," the number of illegal immigrants coming from Mexico increased by 6,000 percent. It is estimated that before Operation Wetback got underway, more than a million workers had crossed the Rio Grande illegally. Cheap labor displaced native agricultural workers, and increased violation of labor laws and discrimination encouraged criminality, disease, and illiteracy. According to a study conducted in 1950 by the President's Commission on Migratory Labor in Texas, the Rio Grande Valley cotton growers were paying approximately half of the wages paid elsewhere in Texas. The United States Border Patrol aided by municipal, county, state, federal authorities, and the military, began a quasi-military operation of the search and seizure of all illegal immigrants. Fanning out from the lower Rio Grande Valley, Operation Wetback moved Northward. Initially, illegal immigrants were repatriated through Presidio because the Mexican city across the border, Ojinaga, had rail connections to the interior of Mexico by which workers could be quickly moved on to Durango. The forces used by the government were relatively small, perhaps no more than 700 men, but were augmented by border patrol officials who hoped to scare illegal workers into fleeing back to Mexico. Ships became a preferred mode of transport because they carried illegal workers farther from the border than buses, trucks, or trains.  It is difficult to estimate the number of illegal immigrants that left due to the operation—most voluntarily. The INS claimed as many as 1,300,000, though the number officially apprehended did not come anywhere near this total.  The program was ultimately abandoned due to questions surrounding the ethics of its implementation. Citizens of Mexican descent complained of police stopping all "Mexican looking" people and utilizing extreme "police-state" methods including deportation of American-born children who were citizens by law.

The failed 1956 Hungarian Revolution, before being crushed by the Soviets, forged a temporary hole in the Iron Curtain that allowed a burst of refugees to escape, with 245,000 Hungarian families being admitted by 1960. From 1950 to 1960, the U.S. had 2,515,000 new immigrants with 477,000 arriving from Germany, 185,000 from Italy, 52,000 from the Netherlands, 203,000 from the UK, 46,000 from Japan, 300,000 from Mexico, and 377,000 from Canada.

The 1959 Cuban Revolution led by Fidel Castro drove the upper and middle classes to exile, and 409,000 families immigrated to the U.S. by 1970.  This was facilitated by the 1966 Cuban Adjustment Act, which gave permanent resident status to Cubans physically present in the United States for one year if they entered after January 1, 1959.

Immigration and Nationality Act of 1965 (Hart–Celler Act)
This all changed with the passage of the Immigration and Nationality Act of 1965, a by-product of the civil rights movement and one of President Lyndon Johnson's Great Society programs. The measure had not been intended to stimulate immigration from Asia, the Middle East, Africa, and elsewhere in the developing world. Rather, by doing away with the racially-based quota system, its authors had expected that immigrants would come from "traditional" societies such as Italy, Greece, and Portugal, places subject to very small quotas in the 1924 Act. The 1965 Act replaced the quotas with preferential categories based on family relationships and job skills, giving particular preference to potential immigrants with relatives in the United States and with occupations deemed critical by the U.S. Department of Labor. After 1970, following an initial influx from European countries, immigrants from places like Korea, China, India, the Philippines, and Pakistan, as well as countries in Africa became more common.

1980s
In 1986, the Immigration Reform and Control Act (IRCA) was passed, creating, for the first time, penalties for employers who hired illegal immigrants.  IRCA, as proposed in Congress, was projected to give amnesty to about 1,000,000 workers in the country illegally. In practice, amnesty for about 3,000,000 immigrants already in the United States was granted. Most were from Mexico.  Legal Mexican immigrant family numbers were 2,198,000 in 1980, 4,289,000 in 1990 (includes IRCA), and 7,841,000 in 2000. Adding another 12,000,000 illegal immigrants of which about 80% are thought to be Mexicans would bring the Mexican family total to over 16,000,000—about 16% of the Mexican population.

1990s: Illegal Immigration Reform and Immigration Responsibility Act of 1996 

Passed in September 1996, the Illegal Immigration Reform and Immigration Responsibility Act (IIRIRA) was a comprehensive immigration reform focused on restructuring the process for admitting or removing undocumented immigrants. Its passing helped to strengthen U.S. immigration laws, restructured immigration law enforcement, and sought to limit immigration by addressing undocumented migration. These reforms affected legal immigrants, those seeking entry into the U.S., and those living undocumented in the U.S.

IIRIRA Changes to Asylum 
IIRIRA created new barriers for refugees seeking asylum in the U.S. by narrowing asylum criteria previously established in the Refugee Act of 1980. To prevent fraudulent asylum filings from people who were migrating for economic or work-related reasons, IIRIRA imposed an all-inclusive filing deadline called the "One Year Bar" to asylum. IIRIRA provided limited exceptions to this rule when an "alien demonstrates to the satisfaction of the Attorney General either the existence of changed circumstances which materially affect the applicant's eligibility for asylum or extraordinary circumstances relating to the delay in filing the application." IIRIRA also made the asylum process more difficult for refugees by allowing for the resettlement of refugees to third countries, "precluding appeals" to denied asylum applications, implementing higher processing fees, and having enforcement officers rather than judges determine the expedited removal of refugees.

IIRIRA and Illegal Immigration 
Law enforcement under IIRIRA was strengthened to restrict unlawful immigration. The Act sought to prevent illegal immigration by expanding the number of Border Patrol agents and allowing the Attorney General to obtain resources from other federal agencies. Provisions were also made to improve infrastructure and barriers along the U.S. border area. IIRIRA also delegated law enforcement capabilities to state and local officers via 287(g) agreements. Illegal entry into the U.S. was made more difficult by cooperation between federal and local law enforcement, in addition to stiffening penalties for illegal entry and racketeering activities which included alien smuggling and document fraud.

IIRIRA addressed unlawful migration already present in the U.S. through enhanced tracking systems that included detecting employment eligibility and visa stay violations as well as creating counterfeit-resistant forms of identification. The Act also established the 3 and 10 year re-entry bars for immigrants who accumulated unlawful presence in the U.S. and become inadmissible upon leaving the country.

The restructuring of law enforcement contributed to an increased number of arrests, detentions, and removals of immigrants. Under IIRIRA, the mandatory detention of broad groups of immigrants occurred, including those who had legal residence status but upon removal could have their status be removed after committing violent crimes. Relief and access to federal services were also redefined for immigrants as IIRIRA reiterated the 1996 Welfare Reform Act's tier system between citizens, legal immigrants, refugees, and illegal immigrants which determined public benefits eligibility. In addition, IIRIRA also redefined financial self-sufficiency guidelines of sponsors who previously did not have to meet an income requirement to sponsor an immigrant.

Immigration summary since 1830

The top ten birth countries of the foreign born population since 1830, according to the U.S. census, are shown below. Blank entries mean that the country did not make it into the top ten for that census, not that there is no data from that census. The 1830 numbers are from immigration statistics as listed in the 2004 Year Book of Immigration Statistics.

The 1830 numbers list un-naturalized foreign citizens and does not include naturalized foreign born. The 1850 census is the first census that asks for place of birth. The historical census data can be found online in the Virginia Library Geostat Center. Population numbers are in thousands.

Historical foreign-born population by state

See also

 Demographics of the United States
 History of immigration to Canada
 Hyphenated American
 Guest Worker Program
 Melting pot
 Nativism in United States politics
 Race and ethnicity in the United States

Ethnic groups

 European Americans
 Albanian Americans
 Basque Americans
 Belarusian Americans
 Bosnian Americans
 Breton Americans
 Bulgarian Americans
 Catalan Americans
 Cornish Americans
 Croatian Americans
 Czech Americans
 Danish Americans
 Dutch Americans
 English Americans
 Estonian Americans
 Finnish Americans
 French Americans
 German Americans
 Greek Americans
 Hungarian Americans
 Icelandic Americans
 Irish Americans
 Italian Americans
 Latvian Americans
 Lithuanian Americans
 Macedonian Americans
 Maltese Americans
 Manx Americans
 Montenegrin Americans
 Norwegian Americans
 Polish Americans
 Portuguese Americans
 Romanian Americans
 Russian Americans
 Scottish Americans
 Serbian Americans
 Slovak Americans
 Slovenian Americans
 Swedish Americans
 Ukrainian Americans
 Spanish Americans
 Welsh Americans

 Middle Eastern Americans
 Arab Americans
 Armenian Americans
 Assyrian Americans
 Azerbaijani Americans
 Baloch Americans
 Berber Americans
 Chechen Americans
 Circassian Americans
 Georgian Americans
 Iranian Americans
 Jewish Americans
 Kazakh Americans
 Kurdish Americans
 Pashtun Americans
 Tajik Americans
 Turkish Americans
 Uyghur Americans
 Uzbek Americans
 African Americans
 Central Africans in the United States
 East Africans in the United States
 Southern Africans in the United States
 West Africans in the United States
 Native Americans
 Alaska Natives

 Asian Americans
 Bangladeshi Americans
 Bengali Americans
 Bhutanese Americans
 Burmese Americans
 Karen Americans
 Cambodian Americans
 Chinese Americans
 Taiwanese Americans
 Tibetan Americans
 Filipino Americans
 Hmong Americans
 Indian Americans
 Gujarati Americans
 Tamil Americans
 Telugu Americans
 Indonesian Americans
 Iu Mien Americans
 Japanese Americans
 Ryukyuan Americans
 Korean Americans
 Laotian Americans
 Malaysian Americans
 Maldivian Americans
 Mongolian Americans
 Nepalese Americans
 Pakistani Americans
 Punjabi Americans
 Sindhi Americans
 Romani Americans
 Sri Lankan Americans
 Thai Americans
 Vietnamese Americans
 Pacific Islander Americans
 Fijian Americans
 French Polynesian Americans
 Māori Americans
 Marshallese Americans
 Micronesian Americans
 Native Hawaiians
 Palauan Americans
 Samoan Americans
 Tongan Americans

References

Bibliography

 Anderson, Kristen L. Immigration in American History (Routledge, 2021). excerpt
 Barkan, Elliott Robert. And Still They Come: Immigrants and American Society, 1920 to the 1990s (1996), by leading historian
 Barkan, Elliott Robert, ed. A Nation of Peoples: A Sourcebook on America's Multicultural Heritage (1999), 600 pp; essays by scholars on 27 groups
 Barone, Michael. The New Americans: How the Melting Pot Can Work Again (2006)
 Bayor, Ronald H., ed. The Oxford Handbook of American Immigration and Ethnicity (2015)
 Bodnar, John. The Transplanted: A History of Immigrants in Urban America (1985)
 Dassanowsky, Robert, and Jeffrey Lehman, eds. Gale Encyclopedia of Multicultural America (2nd ed. 3 vol 2000), anthropological approach to 150 culture groups; 1974 pp
 Gerber, David A. American immigration: A very short introduction (2021). excerpt
 Gjerde, Jon, ed.  Major Problems in American Immigration and Ethnic History (1998) primary sources and excerpts from scholars.
 Kenny, Kevin. "Mobility and Sovereignty: The Nineteenth-Century Origins of Immigration Restriction." Journal of American History 109.2 (2022): 284-297. https://doi.org/10.1093/jahist/jaac233
 Levinson, David and Melvin Ember, eds. American Immigrant Cultures 2 vol (1997) covers all major and minor groups
 Meier, Matt S. and Gutierrez, Margo, eds. The Mexican American Experience: An Encyclopedia (2003)
 Thernstrom, Stephan; Orlov, Ann; Handlin, Oscar, eds. Harvard Encyclopedia of American Ethnic Groups, Harvard University Press, the standard reference, covering all major groups and most minor groups online
 Wyman, Mark. Round-Trip to America: The Immigrants Return to Europe, 1880–1930 (Cornell UP, 1993).

Recent migrations
 Borjas, George J. "Does Immigration Grease the Wheels of the Labor Market?" Brookings Papers on Economic Activity, 2001
 Fragomen Jr, Austin T. "The illegal immigration reform and immigrant responsibility act of 1996: An overview." International Migration Review 31.2 (1997): 438–60.
 Hernández, Kelly Lytle. "The Crimes and Consequences of Illegal Immigration: A Cross-Border Examination of Operation Wetback, 1943 to 1954," Western Historical Quarterly, 37 (Winter 2006), 421–44.
 Kemp, Paul. Goodbye Canada? (2003), from Canada to U.S.
 Khadria, Binod. The Migration of Knowledge Workers: Second-Generation Effects of India's Brain Drain, (2000)
 Mullan, Fitzhugh. "The Metrics of the Physician Brain Drain." New England Journal of Medicine, Volume 353:1810–18  October 27, 2005  Number 17
 Odem, Mary and William Brown. Living Across Borders: Guatemala Migrants in the U.S. South Southern Spaces, 2011.
 Palmer, Ransford W. In Search of a Better Life: Perspectives on Migration from the Caribbean Praeger, 1990.
 Skeldon, Ronald,  and Wang Gungwu; Reluctant Exiles? Migration from Hong Kong and the New Overseas Chinese 1994.
 Smith, Michael Peter,  and Adrian Favell. The Human Face of Global Mobility: International Highly Skilled Migration in Europe, North America and the Asia-Pacific, (2006)
 Wong, Tom K. The politics of immigration: Partisanship, demographic change, and American national identity (Oxford UP, 2017).

Historical studies
 Alexander, June Granatir. Daily Life in Immigrant America, 1870–1920: How the Second Great Wave of Immigrants Made Their Way in America (2nd ed. Ivan R. Dee, 2009) 332 pp.
 Archdeacon, Thomas J. Becoming American: An Ethnic History (1984)
 Bankston, Carl L. III and Danielle Antoinette Hidalgo, eds. Immigration in U.S. History (2006)
 Bergquist, James M. Daily Life in Immigrant America, 1820–1870: How the First Great Wave of Immigrants Made Their Way in America (2nd ed. Ivan R. Dee, 2009) 329 pp.
 Cohn, Raymond L. Mass Migration under Sail: European Immigration to the Antebellum United States (2009) 254 pp.; emphasis on economic issues
 Daniels, Roger.  Coming to America 2nd ed. (2002) 
 Daniels, Roger.  Guarding the Golden Door: American Immigration Policy and Immigrants Since 1882 (2005)
 Eltis, David; Coerced and Free Migration: Global Perspectives (2002) emphasis on migration to Americas before 1800
 Glynn, Irial: Emigration Across the Atlantic: Irish, Italians and Swedes compared, 1800–1950 , European History Online, Mainz: Institute of European History, 2011, retrieved: June 16, 2011.
 Handlin, Oscar. The Uprooted: The Epic Story of the Great Migrations That Made the American People (1951), classic interpretive history; Pulitzer prize for history
  Hoerder, Dirk  and Horst Rössler, eds. Distant Magnets: Expectations and Realities in the Immigrant Experience, 1840–1930 1993. 312 pp
 Hourwich, Isaac.  Immigration and Labor: The Economic Aspects of European Immigration to the United States (1912), argues immigrants were beneficial to natives by pushing them upward
 Hutchinson, Edward P. Legislative history of American immigration policy, 1798–1965 (U of Pennsylvania Press, 2016).
 Jenks, Jeremiah W.  and W. Jett Lauck,  The Immigrant Problem (1912; 6th ed. 1926) based on 1911 Immigration Commission report, with additional data
 Kulikoff, Allan; From British Peasants to Colonial American Farmers (2000), details on colonial immigration
 LeMay, Michael, and Elliott Robert Barkan. U.S. Immigration and Naturalization Laws and Issues: A Documentary History (1999)
 Miller, Kerby M. Emigrants and Exiles (1985), influential scholarly interpretation of Irish immigration
 Motomura, Hiroshi. Americans in Waiting: The Lost Story of Immigration and Citizenship in the United States (2006), legal history
 Wittke, Carl. We Who Built America: The Saga of the Immigrant (1939), 552 pp good older history that covers major groups

Historiography
 Abramitzky, Ran, and Leah Boustan. "Immigration in American economic history." Journal of Economic Literature 55.4 (2017): 1311–45. online
 Archdeacon, Thomas J. "Problems and Possibilities in the Study of American Immigration and Ethnic History", International Migration Review Vol. 19, No. 1 (Spring, 1985), pp. 112–34 in JSTOR
 Diner, Hasia. "American Immigration and Ethnic History: Moving the Field Forward, Staying the Course", Journal of American Ethnic History 25#4 (2006), pp. 130–41
 Gabaccia, Donna. "Immigrant Women: Nowhere at Home?" Journal of American Ethnic History Vol. 10, No. 4 (Summer, 1991), pp. 61–87 in JSTOR
 Gabaccia, Donna R. "Do We Still Need Immigration History?", Polish American Studies Vol. 55, No. 1 (Spring, 1998), pp. 45–68 in JSTOR
 Gerber, David A. “Immigration Historiography at the Crossroads.” Reviews in American History, 39#1 (2011), pp. 74–86. online
 Gerber, David A. "What's Wrong with Immigration History?" Reviews in American History v 36 (December 2008): 543–56.
 Gerber, David, and Alan Kraut, eds. American immigration and ethnicity: a reader (Springer, 2016), escerpts from scholars excerpts
 Gjerde, Jon. "New Growth on Old Vines – The State of the Field: The Social History of Ethnicity and Immigration in the United States", Journal of American Ethnic History 18 (Summer 1999): 40–65. in JSTOR
 Harzig, Christiane, and Dirk Hoerder. What is Migration History (2009) excerpt and text search
 Hollifield, James F. "American Immigration Politics: An Unending Controversy." Revue europeenne des migrations internationales 32.3 et 4 (2016): 271–96. online
 Joranger, Terje, and Mikael Hasle. "A Historiographical Perspective on the Social History of Immigration to and Ethnicity in the United States",  Swedish-American Historical Quarterly, (2009) 60#1, pp. 5–24
 Jung, Moon-Ho. "Beyond These Mythical Shores: Asian American History and the Study of Race", History Compass, (2008) 6#2  pp. 627–38
 Kazal, Russell A. "Revisiting Assimilation: The Rise, Fall, and Reappraisal of a Concept in American Ethnic History", American Historical Review (1995) 100#2, pp. 437–71 in JSTOR
 Kenny, Kevin. "Twenty Years of Irish American Historiography", Journal of American Ethnic History, (2009), 28#4  pp. 67–75
 Lederhendler, Eli. "The New Filiopietism, or Toward a New History of Jewish Immigration to America", American Jewish History, (2007) 93#1 pp. 1–20
 Lee, Erika. "A part and apart: Asian American and immigration history." Journal of American Ethnic History 34.4 (2015): 28–42. online
 Meagher, Timothy J. "From the World to the Village and the Beginning to the End and After: Research Opportunities in Irish American History", Journal of American Ethnic History, Summer 2009, Vol. 28 Issue 4, pp. 118–35 in JSTOR
 Obinna, Denise N. "Lessons in Democracy: America's Tenuous History with Immigrants." Journal of Historical Sociology 31.3 (2018): 238-252. online
 Persons, Stow. Ethnic Studies in Chicago, 1905–1945 (1987), on Chicago school of sociology
 
 Ross, Dorothy. The Origins of American Social Science (1992), pp. 143–71, 303–89 on early sociological studies
 Rothman, David J.  "The Uprooted: Thirty Years Later", Reviews in American History 10 (September 1982): 311–19, on influence of Oscar Handlin in JSTOR
 
 Stolarik, M. Mark. "From Field to Factory: The Historiography  of Slovak Immigration to the United States", International Migration Review, Spring 1976, Vol. 10 Issue 1, pp. 81–102 in JSTOR
 
 Vecoli, Rudolph J.  "Contadini in Chicago: A Critique of The Uprooted", Journal of American History 5 (December 1964): 404–17, critique of Handlin in JSTOR
 Vecoli, Rudolph J.   "'Over the Years I Have Encountered the Hazards and Rewards that Await the Historian of Immigration,' George M. Stephenson and the Swedish American Community", Swedish American Historical Quarterly 51 (April 2000): 130–49.
 Weinberg, Sydney Stahl, et al. "The Treatment of Women in Immigration History: A Call for Change" Journal of American Ethnic History 11#4 (Summer, 1992), pp. 25–69 in JSTOR
 Yans-McLaughlin, Virginia ed. Immigration Reconsidered: History, Sociology, and Politics (1990)

Primary sources
 U.S. Immigration Commission, Reports of the Immigration Commission (1911) complete set of reports
 Abstracts of Reports, 2 vols. (1911); summary of the full 42-volume report; see also Jenks and Lauck
 Reports of the Immigration Commission: Statements (1911) text of statements pro and con
 Chicago Foreign Language Press Survey: English translations of 120,000 pages of newspaper articles from Chicago's foreign language press from 1855 to 1938.

 
Articles containing video clips
History of the United States by topic